Eyelash extensions are a cosmetic enhancement that involves attaching synthetic or natural hair fibers to the natural eyelashes to create a fuller, more dramatic look. They are applied by a professional using a specialized adhesive and can last for several weeks with proper care. Eyelash extensions are available in various lengths, thicknesses, and curvatures, and can be made from synthetic or natural materials. They offer a semi-permanent way to enhance the appearance of the eyes and can be a convenient alternative to traditional mascaras and false lashes.

History
In 1879, James D. McCabe wrote The National Encyclopædia of Business and Social Forms, where, in the section "Laws of Etiquette", he stated that eyelashes could be lengthened by cutting the ends with a pair of scissors. Other beauty books, such as My Lady's Dressing Room (1892) by Baronne Staffe and Beauty's Aids or How to be Beautiful (1901) by Countess C also state that the trimming of eyelashes along with the use of the pomade Trikogene benefit eyelash growth. Countess C also suggested that eyelashes can be given extra length and strength by washing them every evening with a mixture of water and walnut leaves. 

In 1882, Henry Labouchère of Truth reported that "Parisians have found out how to make false eyelashes" by having hair sewn into the eyelids. A similar report appeared in the July 6, 1899, edition of The Dundee Courier which described the painful method for elongating the lashes. The headline read, "Irresistible Eyes May Be Had by Transplanting the Hair." The article explained how the procedure achieved longer lashes by having hair from the head sewn into the eyelids. 

In 1902, German-born hair specialist and noted inventor Charles Nessler (aka Karl Nessler or Charles Nestle) patented "A New or Improved Method of and Means for the Manufacture of Artificial Eyebrows, Eyelashes and the like" in the United Kingdom. By 1903, he began selling artificial eyelashes at his London salon on Great Castle Street. He used the profits from his sales to fund his next invention, the permanent wave machine. A permanent wave machine was commonly called a perm and involves the use of heat and/or chemicals to break and reform the cross-linking bonds of the hair structure. In 1911, a Canadian woman named Anna Taylor patented false eyelashes in the United States. Taylor's false eyelashes were designed using a crescent-shaped strip of fabric. The fabric had tiny pieces of hair placed on them.

Another noted inventor of eyelash extensions is Maksymilian Faktorowicz, a Polish beauty guru and businessman, who founded the company Max Factor.

In 1916, while making his film Intolerance, director D. W. Griffith wanted actress Seena Owen to have lashes "that brushed her cheeks, to make her eyes shine larger than life." The false eyelashes which were made from human hair were specifically woven piece by piece by a local wig maker. The eyelashes were adhered using spirit gum, commonly used for affixing wigs. One day Owen showed up to sit with her eyes swollen nearly shut, her co-star Lillian Gish, wrote in her memoir.

By the 1930s, false eyelashes were becoming more acceptable for the average woman to wear. This shift in cultural opinion was largely due to the influence of film actresses that were seen wearing them on screen. Featured in Vogue, false eyelashes had officially become mainstream and given the Vogue stamp of approval. 

In the 1960s, false eyelashes became the centerpiece of makeup. During this era, eye makeup that gave women big doll-like eyes was very common. They achieved this look by applying false eyelashes on both the top and bottom eyelashes. Models like Twiggy helped popularize this trend and is often associated with it. 

In 1968 at the feminist Miss America protest, protestors symbolically threw a number of feminine products into a "Freedom Trash Can". These included false eyelashes, which were among items the protestors called "instruments of female torture" and accouterments of what they perceived to be enforced femininity.

In 2008, Aesthetic Korea Co., Ltd. began to manufacture products as semi-permanent eyelashes, which became popular in Korea. 
Since then, several similar companies have started to set up, which has had a considerable impact on neighboring countries, including China and Japan. However, due to South Korea's annual rise in labor costs, many manufacturers have moved from South Korea to China or Vietnam.

In 2014, Miami-based Katy Stoka, founder of One Two Cosmetics, invented the magnetic false lash as an alternative to those that utilize glue. Today magnetic eyelashes are becoming more and more common, with many mainstream brands like Ardell and To Glam, offering more affordable options. However, these are false eyelashes and not eyelash extensions.

Types and styles
False eyelashes and semi-permanent eyelash extensions both enhance the length and volume of eyelashes, although they differ in various ways. 

Classic lashes are a 1:1 ratio of one extension applied to one natural lash. Hybrid lashes are classic lashes and volume fan lashes mixed together. Volume lashes are two to six thin eyelash extensions that make a fan shape to allow for a look of full fluffy lashes. Mega volume lashes are 10 or more super-thin eyelash extensions. Pre-made fans are ready-made volume eyelash extensions. They are arranged on the sticker strip for easy pick-up and quick application.

Hybrid lashes involve both classic individual eyelash extensions and volume fans mixed together for the ultimate in fluffy, textured lashes. Also referred to as a "mixed set", they offer a thicker, denser look than classic lashes, but without the uniformity and softness of a typical Russian volume set.

Temporary false lashes 
Temporary false lashes are applied with temporary lash glue and are not designed to be worn when showering, sleeping or swimming. The lashes come as individuals, clusters, and most commonly, lash strips. The magnetic lashes work by placing the magnetic false lash between one's eyelashes, thereby sandwiching in natural eyelashes with the magnetic eyelashes. While using magnetic eyelashes always be careful, as it is totally a different mechanism. When using a glue method, the user smears the glue on the false lash, letting it settle in for 30 seconds and then presses it against the top root of their eyelashes until the glue has dried enough.

Techniques 
There are two basic technologies, bundle and ciliary. With the bundle method, ready-made bundles of eyelashes fastened together are used, while ciliary building is a way of piece building: one or several artificial ones are glued to one natural eyelash.

Process 
In the United States, eyelash extension services can range from $80 to $500, depending on:

 The number and type of lashes being used 
 The skill level of the cosmetician or aesthetician
 The venue where the extensions are applied

Because an average person might have anywhere from one hundred to two hundred lashes per eye, it can take from one to three hours to attach a full, new set. The number of lashes one can put on varies upon the existing natural eyelashes. Because humans lose natural eyelashes every day the eyelash extensions usually last between three and four weeks and during that time period, natural lashes start falling out or thinning. Maintaining a full set of eyelashes requires a refill every two to three weeks or a partial set every four weeks. If done correctly, there should be no damage to the natural lashes. It is important to find a trained professional to preserve lash growth and reduce the chance of eye complications.

Training and certification 
There are different companies that provide training and certification for potential Eyelash Extensions Technicians.

In the United States, each state individually regulates this industry. Some states require either a Cosmetology or Esthetician License and some states have a certificate or license just for Lash Technicians. 

In the UK, the Guild of Professional Beauty Therapists accredited courses for the safe application of semi-permanent individual eyelash extensions. The value of the course content can be judged by the number of CPD (Continued Professional Development) points that the course is awarded.

See also 
 Eyelash
 Eyelash curler
 Eyelash perm

References

External links 

 The History of Women and Their Eyelashes at MarieClaire.com
 History of Artificial (false) Eyelashes at Cosmetics and Skin

Cosmetics
Human eyelashes